Murder on Mars is a juvenile science fiction novel, the sixteenth in Hugh Walters' Chris Godfrey of U.N.E.X.A. series. It was published in the UK by Faber in 1975. It was the second in the series to switch to detective work rather than space exploration.

Plot summary
In a crater on Mars an engineer from Mars Base has been found dead, his spacesuit slashed. Despite having a large number of suspects to interview, Morrey Kant, Serge Smyslov and Tony Hale's questioning flushes out a prime suspect. But Tony does not believe they have the right man and hatches a dangerous plan to find the real killer.

External links
Murder on Mars page

1975 British novels
1975 science fiction novels
Children's mystery novels
Chris Godfrey of U.N.E.X.A. series
Faber and Faber books
Novels set on Mars
1975 children's books